Øyvind Leonhardsen (born 17 August 1970) is a Norwegian former professional footballer who played as a midfielder. He retired after the 2007 season, ending a career with nine years in English football at clubs Wimbledon, Liverpool, Tottenham Hotspur, and Aston Villa, and in Norway he played for Molde, Rosenborg, Lyn, and Strømsgodset. Between 1990 and 2003 he made 86 appearances for the Norway national team scoring 19 goals.

Club career

In Norway
Leonhardsen started his career in Clausenengen before he, as a 19-year-old, moved to Premier Division side Molde in 1989. Two years later he was brought to Norwegian champions Rosenborg.

Leonhardsen won the honorable Kniksen award as the best midfielder in 1989, 1991, 1992 and 1993. He was voted the Player's Player of the Year in Norway in 1994.

In England
Leonhardsen moved to Wimbledon in the Premier League the following season, where he made an instant impact on the left wing. He spent three seasons with Wimbledon, and helped them reach the semi finals of both the FA Cup and Football League Cup in his final season there. He was sold to Liverpool for £3.5million in May 1997, and was initially a regular member of the first team under the management of Roy Evans.

After Gerard Houllier's continental revolution of Liverpool from 1999, Leonhardsen fell out of favour at Anfield and was sold to Tottenham Hotspur, before joining Aston Villa on a free transfer in August 2002.

Return to Norway
Leonhardsen moved back to Norway in 2004 to join FC Lyn Oslo, where he became the captain. He signed a two-year contract with second-level club Strømsgodset IF from Drammen in December 2005.

Leonhardsen retired aged 37 after helping securing Strømsgodset's promotion to Tippeligaen in 2006, and later retaining their place in the league in 2007.

Leonhardsen began working as a youth coach at his former club Lyn. In 2018 he became assistant coach of Mjøndalen IF.

International career
Leonhardsen made 86 appearances for the Norway national team, scoring 19 goals. He was part of the 1994 and 1998 FIFA World Cup squads.

In Norway, the expression "a Leo run" is derived from Leonhardsen's running capacity and smart movements. He seemed to have an uncanny instinct for anticipating when and where a loose ball would present him with a scoring chance, directing and timing his runs to make sure he'd be there to exploit it - hence his impressive scoring rate for a midfielder. He is reckoned as somewhat of a cult hero and a symbol of the Norway national team success in the 1990s. He earned great respect during his career due to his highly professional approach to the game.

References

External links
 
 

Living people
1970 births
Sportspeople from Kristiansund
Norwegian footballers
Association football midfielders
Norway youth international footballers
Norway international footballers
Eliteserien players
Clausenengen FK players
Molde FK players
Rosenborg BK players
Premier League players
Wimbledon F.C. players
Liverpool F.C. players
Tottenham Hotspur F.C. players
Aston Villa F.C. players
Lyn Fotball players
Strømsgodset Toppfotball players
1994 FIFA World Cup players
1998 FIFA World Cup players
Norwegian expatriate footballers
Norwegian expatriate sportspeople in England
Expatriate footballers in England
Mjøndalen IF non-playing staff